The 2014–16 European Nations Cup Second Division is the third tier rugby union in Europe behind the Six Nations Championship and the 2014–16 European Nations Cup First Division.

The second division comprises four pools (2A, 2B, 2C, and 2D). Teams within each division play each other in a home and away round robin schedule over a two-year period.

At the end of every season a champion is declared, but for relegation and promotion only the two years ranking are considered.

Starting in the 2016–2017 season, standings over one-year cycles will be used for promotion and relegation, instead of two-year cycles

With the adoption of the new format for 2016–17 Rugby Europe International Championships, the relegation/promotion format was changed, at the end of tournament.

While the first of pool A will be always promoted to First Division 1 Pool B, now renamed 2016–17 Rugby Europe Trophy, for other ranked teams all change in this way

 A New 2016–17 Rugby Europe Conference 1 will be formed with the team originally destined to 2016–17 Pool A and Pool B, but will be divided in two pool according to the geographical basis.
 A New 2016–17 Rugby Europe Conference 2 will be formed with the team originally destined to 2016–17 Pool C and Pool D, but will be divided in two pool according to the geographical basis.

(Originally The first in the 2014–2016 ranking of each pool will be promoted while last place teams will be relegated. Winners of pool 2A, will be promoted to division 1 pool B for the 2016–17 edition while the last place team in pool 2A will be relegated to pool 2B. Likewise, winners of 2B will be promoted to 2A, last place in 2B will be relegated to 2C, winner of 2C will be promoted to 2B, last place of 2C will be relegated to 2D, winner of 2D will be promoted to 2C and last place of 2D will be relegated to 3; The winner of 3 replacing the relegated 2D team.)

Division 2A

2014–2015
Table

Pre-tournament IRB rankings in parentheses (as at 20 October 2014)

Games

2015–16
Table

Games

2014–2016
Combined table

Pre-tournament IRB rankings in parentheses (as at 20 October 2014)

Division 2B

2014–2015
Table

Pre-tournament IRB rankings in parentheses (as at 13 October 2014). Cyprus are not a full member of the IRB, and therefore have no rating (NR).

Games

Note: The loss by Cyprus ended their world record winning streak of 24 consecutive wins, extending back to November 2008.

2015–16
Table

Games

2014–2016

Pre-tournament IRB rankings in parentheses (as at 13 October 2014). Cyprus are not a full member of the IRB, and therefore have no rating (NR).

Division 2C

2014–2015
Table

Pre-tournament IRB rankings in parentheses (as at 6 October 2014).

Games

2015–16
Table

Games

2014–2016

Pre-tournament IRB rankings in parentheses (as at 6 October 2014).

Division 2D
The 2014–15 season game between Norway and Turkey, as well as the game between Finland and Bulgaria, were deferred to the 2015–16 season.  The second match between Norway and Finland, as well as Turkey and Bulgaria, was played during the 2014–15 season, instead of during the 2015–16 season.  This ensured all teams played four games in each season.

2014–2015
Table

Pre-tournament IRB rankings in parentheses (as at 29 September 2014).  Turkey are not a full member of the IRB, and therefore have no rating (NR).

Games

2015–16
Table

-->

Games

2014–2016

Pre-tournament IRB rankings in parentheses (as at 29 September 2014).  Turkey are not a full member of the IRB, and therefore have no rating (NR).

References

2014-16
2014–15 in European rugby union
2015–16 in European rugby union
European Nations Cup Second Division
European Nations Cup Second Division
European Nations Cup Second Division